RTÉ 2XM is a digital radio station of the Irish public-service broadcaster Raidió Teilifís Éireann (RTÉ). RTÉ 2XM is a sister station to RTÉ 2fm and focuses on alternative and indie music. The station is available nationally on Saorview Ireland's free to air DTT service, cable TV, online and via RTÉ Radio Player.

History
Initially RTÉ placed the station on the digital terrestrial television trial service in late October 2007. Along with five other new digital stations, RTÉ 2XM was launched on 1 December 2008. The station plays a broad range of music from rock, indie, metal, pop-punk, electronica, alternative and nu metal, as well as a focus on playing music from homegrown artists in Ireland. The station has also been known to carry a selection of live music with content from festivals across Europe. It was the first RTÉ digital radio station to have carried live content, with music from the Oxegen festival during July 2007 and the Electric Picnic and PlanetLove Summer Session festivals during September 2007. This continued in 2008 with the PlanetLove Winter Session in February.

On 6 November 2019 RTÉ management announced that as part of a major cost-saving program all its digital radio stations would be closed. However on 2 March 2021 it was revealed by RTÉ that the broadcaster would close its DAB radio network while retaining its digital radio services, including RTÉ 2XM.

RTÉ 2XM WebTV
2XM WebTV debuted online during the RTÉ coverage of the Oxegen 2008 music festival on weekend of 11–14 July 2008

Garageland

Garageland is a weekly radio show broadcast on RTE 2XM Mondays from 8pm. The show is hosted by Dermot Lambert of the band Blink. The radio show brings listeners closer to the Irish music scene, and features music and interviews with bands from around Ireland.

Current presenters
Dan Hegarty - The Alternative
John Kenny - The Jk Experience
John Connolly - ABC to XTC
Dermot Lambert - Garageland
Peter Curtin - Groovers Corner
Handsome Paddy - No Static
Ali Dowey - The Bunker
Simon Mulcahy
Painted Flowers with Mr Myth
Laura-Lee Conboy - Shadowplay
Gavin Morrison - Through The Looking Glass
Nessy - The London Ear
Dudley Colley - Click Clack
Pat McGrath - C60
Chris Morrin - Robotnik's Random Rampage

References

External links
 RTÉ 2XM — Official website

Digital-only radio stations
Rock radio stations in Ireland
2XM